Stemphylium cannabinum is a plant pathogen that infects hemp.

References

See also
Dobrozrakova, Taisiia Leonidovna; Letova, M.F.; Stepanov, K.M.; Khokhryakov, M.K. 1956. Opredelitel' Bolezni Rastenii [A manual on the determination of plant diseases]. :1-661

Fungal plant pathogens and diseases
Hemp diseases
Pleosporaceae